Gustav Schrader (1852, Missolonghi, Greece – 1942 Alexandria, Egypt) was a German ornithologist.

Gustav Schrader, the son of a taxidermist was a bird collector and natural history dealer in Port Said. He collected in Egypt, Asia Minor, Ethiopia and Somaliland. Schrader supplied the Halle Saale dealer Wilhelm Schlüter and the Tring ornithologist Walter Rothschild with large series of scientific bird skins.

References
Gebhardt Ludwig, 1964 Die Ornithologen Mitteleuropas.  Giessen: Brühlscher Verlag, 404 pp additions: J. Orn. 111, Special Edition 1970, p. 164-165 and J. Orn. 115, Special Edition 1974, p. 107
Schrader Gustav 1891, 1892 [List of collecting localities between 1875 and 1891]. Orn. Jb. 2,3: Ornithologische Beobachtungen auf meinen Sammelreisen.

German ornithologists
1942 deaths
1852 births